Electronica 1: The Time Machine is the seventeenth studio album by French electronic musician and composer Jean-Michel Jarre, released on 16 October 2015 by Columbia Records. It was recorded with the help of 15 collaborators, including Moby, Vince Clarke of Depeche Mode, Yazoo, and Erasure, Gesaffelstein, M83, Armin van Buuren, John Carpenter, Robert "3D" Del Naja of Massive Attack fame, Pete Townshend (from The Who), and the late Edgar Froese of Tangerine Dream, the collaboration being one of Froese's last projects before dying in January 2015.

Jarre announced on 20 April 2015 "Conquistador" as result of his collaboration with French techno producer Gesaffelstein. On 15 May 2015, a second collaboration, this time with French electronic band M83 titled "Glory" was announced, with a music video for the track being released on 23 June 2015. A third collaboration, this time with German electronic band Tangerine Dream was announced on 22 June 2015.

On 28 August 2015, details of the album and the title Electronica 1: The Time Machine were announced, together with the Little Boots track "If..!". On other hand, the album was nominated for the 59th Annual Grammy Awards in the "Best Dance/Electronic Album" category.

Background
In an interview with Billboard, Jarre said of the album: "I've wanted to tell a story for a while regarding electronic music history and its legacy from my point of view and experience, from when I started to nowadays. I planned to compose for and collaborate with an array of artists, who are, directly or indirectly linked to this scene, with people I admire for their singular contribution to our genre, that represent a source of inspiration for me over the last four decades I have been making music, but who also have an instantly recognizable sound. At the outset, I had no idea how this project would evolve, but I was delighted that everybody I reached out to accepted my invitation." The "E-project" started in 2011 with his unreleased collaboration with David Lynch.

Track listing

Charts and certifications

Weekly charts

Certifications

References

External links
Jean-Michel Jarre reveals more details of E-Project album on Resident Advisor

2015 albums
Jean-Michel Jarre albums
Columbia Records albums